The Leinster Senior Club Football Championship is an annual Gaelic football tournament played on a knockout basis between the senior club championship winners of the competing counties in Leinster. The current holders of the Leinster title are Kilmacud Crokes from Dublin. Offaly side Gracefield were the first winners of the Leinster senior club football championship in the 1970–71 season. The most successful clubs are St. Vincent's from Dublin and Portlaoise from Laois, who have won the Leinster championship on seven occasions. Carlow club Éire Óg won 5 championships in 7 years in the 1990s. Dublin clubs have won the Leinster championship twenty one times, which is more than double any other county. The winner of this competition represents Leinster in the semi-finals of the All-Ireland Senior Club Football Championship.

Wins Listed By Team

Wins Listed By County

No club from Kilkenny, Louth or Wexford has ever won the Leinster Club Football Championship.

Finals Listed By Year

See also
2009 Leinster Senior Club Football Championship

References

Moorefield crowned 2006 champions of Leinster

Sources
 Roll of Honour from Leinster GAA website

Leinster GAA club football competitions